Byte Records is a Belgian based independent music label specialized into dance music. The company was founded by DJ Jean-Paul De Coster in 1988 and is named after his former record store in Antwerp. Successful acts have included 2 Unlimited, Sash! and Sylver.
Through the years the label had several sub-labels like B³ (Byte Blue), Byte Progressive, Discomatic and La Belle Noir.

One of the first Byte releases was "Don't Miss The Party Line" by Jean-Paul De Coster and Peter Neefs as Bizz Nizz. The single was licensed by Cooltempo, a sub-label of Chrysalis (now EMI) and became a top 10 hit in the UK by the end of the 1980s. Together with producer Phil Wilde Jean-Paul De Coster formed the producers duo behind famous Eurodance act 2 Unlimited in the beginning of the 1990s. Licenses were giving by Byte to PWL Continental and ZYX Music and the act sold more than 20 million records and 50 million compilations worldwide, giving Byte Record a tremendous boost.
Other Eurodance acts followed and Byte became a household name in the dance community. Most of the artists became popular in Belgium, The Netherlands and Germany like Timeshift, CB Milton, Red 5, Sash! and DJ Peter Project. But due to the bad economical climate in the music industry Byte had to reduce his activities over the years. Since early 2004 dance act Sylver is the only remaining act signed by Byte Records.

List of Artists
 Bizz Nizz
 2 Unlimited
 Timeshift
 CB Milton
 Ice MC
 740 Boyz
 Murray Head
 Red 5
 Sash!
 The Oh!
 Phats & Small
 DJ Peter Project
 Atlantis 6
 Sylver
 Zippora
 D-Devils

External links
Byte Records official website (no longer active)
Byte Records releases on Discorg

Electronic dance music record labels
House music record labels